Christl Ann Donnelly  is a professor of statistical epidemiology at Imperial College London, the University of Oxford and a Fellow of St Peter's College, Oxford. She serves as associate director of the MRC Centre for Global Infectious Disease Analysis.

Education
Donnelly was educated at Oberlin College in Ohio, where she was awarded a Bachelor of Arts degree, and at Harvard University in Boston, where in 1992 she was awarded Master of Science (MSc) and Doctor of Science (SciD) degrees degrees in biostatistics supervised by Nan Laird and James H. Ware.

Career and research
Donnelly's research investigates statistical and biomathematical methods to analyse epidemiological patterns of infectious diseases such as coronavirus disease 2019 (COVID-19), Influenza A virus subtype H1N1, and Severe acute respiratory syndrome (SARS), Middle East respiratory syndrome (MERS), the Ebola virus disease, zoonoses and HIV/AIDS. She has interests in ecology, conservation, and animal welfare having worked on bovine spongiform encephalopathy (BSE) and Foot-and-mouth disease in cattle, bovine tuberculosis and policies regarding badger culling in the United Kingdom.

Awards and honours
Donnelly was elected a Fellow of the Royal Society (FRS) in 2016 and a Fellow of the Academy of Medical Sciences (FMedSci) in 2015. She was appointed Commander of the Order of the British Empire (CBE) in the 2018 New Year Honours.

In 2016 Donnelly won the Suffrage Science award and in 2018 nominated  at the London School of Hygiene and Tropical Medicine (LSHTM).

References

Living people
Commanders of the Order of the British Empire
Fellows of the Royal Society
Female Fellows of the Royal Society
Harvard School of Public Health alumni
Academics of Imperial College London
Oberlin College alumni
Fellows of the Academy of Medical Sciences (United Kingdom)
Biostatisticians
American women scientists
Women statisticians
British statisticians
1967 births
American women academics
21st-century American women